Chlamydojatropha is a genus of flowering plants belonging to the family Euphorbiaceae.

Its native range is Cameroon.

Species:
 Chlamydojatropha kamerunica Pax & K.Hoffm.

References

Euphorbiaceae
Euphorbiaceae genera